The Gwangyang Football Stadium, nicknamed "Dragon Dungeon", is a football-specific stadium in Gwangyang, South Korea. It is currently used mostly for football matches and is the home stadium of Jeonnam Dragons. The stadium holds 13,496 spectators. It was built in 1992 and opened in 1993.

References

가족과 함께하는 ‘광양 전용구장’  - Dream stadium of K-League

External links
 Jeonnam Dragons official website 
 World Stadiums
 Gwangyang Football Stadium 

Gwangyang
Football venues in South Korea
Buildings and structures in South Jeolla Province
Sport in South Jeolla Province
Jeonnam Dragons
Pohang Steelers
Sports venues completed in 1993
K League 1 stadiums
K League 2 stadiums
1993 establishments in South Korea
20th-century architecture in South Korea